Koniya Sign, or Amami Oshima Sign (AOSL), is a village sign language, or group of languages, on Amami Ōshima, the largest island in the Amami Islands of Japan.

See also 
Ted Supalla
Japanese Sign Language
Miyakubo Sign Language

Bibliography
Osugi, Yutaka; Ted Supalla; and Rebecca Webb (1999). "The use of word elicitation to identify distinctive gestural systems on Amami Island." Sign Language & Linguistics, 2:1:87–112

Village sign languages
Sign languages of Japan
Amami culture